Adultery is a song by Australian rock/pop group Do-Ré-Mi, released by Virgin Records in October 1987, as the lead single from the band's second studio album, The Happiest Place in Town. The song peaked at number 27 on the Australian charts.

The single has five tracks, which were written by lead vocalist Deborah Conway, drummer Dorland Bray, bass guitarist Helen Carter and guitarist Stephen Philip. Three of these has been released as previous singles.

Track listing
"Adultery" (Bray, Carter, Philip)
"Deep Blue Sea"
"Guns and Butter"
"Idiot Grin"
"Warnings Moving Clockwise"

Charts

Personnel
Do-Ré-Mi members
Dorland Bray — drums, percussion, backing vocals
Helen Carter — bass guitar, backing vocals
Deborah Conway — lead vocalist
Stephen Philip — guitar
Additional musicians
Roger Freeman — trombone
Steve Hogarth — keyboards
Recording details
Producer, engineer — Gavin MacKillop
Assistant engineer — Chris Potter, Mike Bigwood, Steve Chase
Studio — Townhouse III Studios London
 Mixing studio — Maison Rouge Studios London, Genetic Studios Reading

References

1987 singles
1987 songs
Do-Re-Mi (band) songs
Virgin Records EPs